Which Way Home is a 2009 documentary film directed by Rebecca Cammisa. The film follows several children who are attempting to get from Mexico and Central America to the United States, on top of a freight train that crosses Mexico known as "La Bestia" (The Beast). Cammisa received a Fulbright Scholar Grant to make the documentary in 2006. The film premiered on HBO on August 24, 2009.

Synopsis 
Each year, thousands of Latin American migrants travel hundreds of miles to the United States, with many making their way on the tops of freight trains. Roughly five percent of those traveling alone are children. As the United States continues to debate immigration reform, the documentary Which Way Home looks the issue through the eyes of children who face the harrowing journey with enormous courage and resourcefulness.

Characters 
Kevin: A fourteen-year-old boy trying to reach America to be able to support his mother back in Honduras. He also leaves attempting to leave his step-father, with whom he has a bad relationship. Eventually, he finds out that life there is equally difficult in different ways. 
Fito: A thirteen-year-old boy trying to find work in America. He leaves his hometown in Honduras with Kevin, also hoping to find a better life away from his grandmother and absent mother.
Yurico ("El Perro"): A seventeen-year-old boy, who leaves Chiapas, Mexico in hopes of finding a family that will adopt him in the US. Having no family, he lives on the streets begging in Chiapas and strikes up a close friendship with Fito on the journey to the border. He struggles with an addiction to huffing glue.
Juan Carlos: A thirteen-year-old boy from Over the Rainbow  who leaves his mother to try and find work in America. He is abandoned by his father, and attempts to reach New York, where his father went.
Olga and Freddy: Two friends on a journey to cross the border to find their family. Olga travels to Minnesota to find her mother while Freddy travels to Illinois to find his father. They were both ages nine years old traveling from Honduras to the US.

Reception

Critical response
Which Way Home has an approval rating of 100% on review aggregator website Rotten Tomatoes, based on 8 reviews, and an average rating of 7.79/10.

Awards and nominations

Won
Emmy, 2010 - Outstanding Informational Programming-Long Form

Nominated
Academy Award 2010 - Best Documentary Feature
Spirit Award 2010 - Best Documentary

Soundtrack
An excerpt from the soundtrack (heard at 0:07:10 and again at 1:06:00) by James Lavino has been adopted by the Turner Classic Movies network to accompany the introduction trailer to feature film presentations in 2016.

References

External links
 
 Which Way Home on HBO
 
 
 http://whichwayhome.net/awards.html

2009 films
2000s English-language films
2000s Spanish-language films
2009 documentary films
American documentary films
Documentary films about illegal immigration to the United States
Mr. Mudd films
Documentary films about children
Documentary films about rail transport
2009 multilingual films
American multilingual films
2000s American films